Ja sam iz Krajine, zemlje kestena is a 2013 Bosnian film directed by Jasmin Duraković. The script for the film is based on screenwriter Mirsad Ćatić's unpublished novel Krvavi zalogaj (Bloody Bite).

Cast
 Edhem Husić as Omer
 Vanessa Glodjo as Dunja
 Mirsad Tuka as Zlatan
 Nikolina Jelisavac as Jasna
 Emina Muftić as Ajka
 Amra Silajdžić as young Ajka
 Muharem Osmić as Jusuf
 Zijah Bajrić as Agent
 Armin Ćatić as Zlatan's father
 Reshad Strik

Release
The film had its premiere in Bihać on 1 July 2013. It was shown in Sarajevo on 4 July, Tuzla 5 July, and in Bugojno on 7 July 2013.

References

External links

2013 films
2010s war films
Bosnia and Herzegovina war drama films
Bosnian-language films
Bosnian War films